The Wilkes-Barre/Scranton Penguins are a professional ice hockey team in the American Hockey League, and are the AHL affiliates of the National Hockey League's Pittsburgh Penguins. They play at the Mohegan Sun Arena at Casey Plaza in Wilkes-Barre Township, Pennsylvania, just outside the city of Wilkes-Barre. They have won the Macgregor Kilpatrick Trophy twice for having the best record in the regular season.

History

The Pittsburgh Penguins' top minor league affiliate throughout the 1990s was the Cleveland Lumberjacks of the IHL. However, in the mid-1990s, the IHL began moving away from being a developmental league and more towards being an independent minor league. For this reason, the Penguins wanted their top minor league affiliate in the AHL. The Penguins purchased the dormant Cornwall Aces AHL franchise from the Colorado Avalanche in 1996, but left the team inactive until the 1999–2000 season due to construction delays at their intended home–a new arena in Wilkes-Barre Township. The team is affectionately referred to as the "Baby Penguins" by fans. Their mascot is Tux the penguin, who wears number No. 99 in reference to the team's first season, in 1999.

The Penguins have gone to the Calder Cup final three times but have never won the championship. The team went all the way to the finals in their second season, losing to the Saint John Flames in six games. The Penguins returned to the finals in their fifth season, but were swept by the Milwaukee Admirals. They most recently made it to the finals in 2008 by way of beating the Portland Pirates in a seven-game series in the Eastern Conference finals. They went on to play the Chicago Wolves in the final, but lost the series in six games.

The WBS Penguins won the Macgregor Kilpatrick Trophy for the best finish in the regular season, in 2011, with 117 points. Goaltender Brad Thiessen was named the recipient of the Aldege "Baz" Bastien Memorial Award, an award given to the AHL's most outstanding goaltender for each season. He posted a record of 35–8–1 in 46 appearances, along with a 1.94 goals-against-average and a .922 save percentage. Head coach John Hynes won the Louis A. R. Pieri Memorial Award, awarded to the most outstanding AHL coach of the season. Despite the best regular season finish in team history, the Penguins were eliminated in the second round of the 2011 playoffs by the Charlotte Checkers in six games.
 
The Penguins have made the playoffs in all but three seasons of their existence. The Penguins held a playoff streak of 16 seasons from the 2002–03 season to the 2017–18 season.

Prior to the 2009–10 season, they held the inaugural Penguins Black and Gold Game, an intra-squad game which featured members of the Pittsburgh and Wilkes-Barre/Scranton Penguins and was the first ever head-to-head meeting between Sidney Crosby and Evgeni Malkin. The game was a complete sellout and tickets never reached the general public. The Penguins organization held its second Black and Gold Game prior to the 2010–11 season on September 19, 2010.

In 2009, they also spawned an affiliated youth level organization, the Wilkes-Barre Junior Pens. The team is based out of the Ice Rink at Coal Street Park, which also serves as a practice facility for the Penguins.

The Penguins' biggest rivals had been the Philadelphia Phantoms, the AHL affiliate of Pennsylvania's other NHL team, the Philadelphia Flyers. After that team moved to Glens Falls, New York, (as the Adirondack Phantoms) the Hershey Bears, also located in Pennsylvania, became the major rivals of the Penguins (they are currently the AHL affiliate of another rival of the Pittsburgh Penguins, the Washington Capitals). In 2014, the Adirondack Phantoms relocated back to eastern Pennsylvania as the Lehigh Valley Phantoms.

Season-by-season results

 Won Macgregor Kilpatrick Trophy for the best record in the regular season Round not held

Players

Current roster
Updated March 18, 2023.

|}

Team captains

Notable alumni
Players listed have played at least 100 games with the Penguins and 100 games in the NHL.

Team records
Single season
Goals: Chris Minard, 34 (2008–09)	
Assists: Jeff Taffe and Janne Pesonen, 50 (2008–09)	
Points: Janne Pesonen, 82 (2008–09)	
Penalty minutes: Dennis Bonvie, 431 (2005–06)
Goaltending wins: Brad Thiessen, 35 (2010–11)
GAA: Jeff Zatkoff 1.93 (2012–13)
SV%: Rich Parent (2000–01), Dany Sabourin (2005–06) and Brad Thiessen (2010–11), .922

Career
Career goals: Tom Kostopoulos, 181
Career assists: Tom Kostopoulos, 269
Career points: Tom Kostopoulos, 450
Career penalty minutes: Dennis Bonvie, 1081
Career goaltending wins: John Curry, 103
Career shutouts: Brad Thiessen, 17
Career games: Tom Kostopoulos, 627

AHL records
As of the 2009–10 AHL Season. Data from the AHL Hall of Fame Website.

Team
Most road wins, 80-game season: 28 (2010–2011) (tied)

Longest road winning streak (one season): 13 games (October 9 – December 3, 2005) (tied)

Longest road winning streak (overall): 15 games (April 10 – December 3, 2005)

Player
Most points by a defenseman, career: John Slaney, 486 (Baltimore, Portland, Cornwall, Wilkes-Barre/Scranton, Philadelphia)

Most goals by a defenseman, career: John Slaney, 157

Most goals by a defenseman, season: John Slaney, 30 (1999–2000)

Most PIM, career: Dennis Bonvie, 4,104 (Cape Breton, Hamilton, Portland,  Philadelphia, Wilkes-Barre/Scranton, Providence, Binghamton, Hershey)

Most PIM, game: Steve Parsons, 64 (March 17, 2002 vs. Syracuse)

AHL awards and trophies
Per the AHL Hall of Fame:

Macgregor Kilpatrick Trophy (AHL regular season champions)
 2016–17
 2010–11

Frank Mathers Trophy (Eastern Conference regular season champions from 2004 to 2011)
 2010–11

Richard F. Canning Trophy (Eastern Conference playoff champions)
 2007–08
 2003–04

F. G. "Teddy" Oke Trophy (East Division regular season champions from 2002 to 2011)
 2010–11
 2007–08
 2005–06

Robert W. Clarke Trophy (Western Conference playoff champions)
 2000–01

Eddie Shore Award (best defenseman)
 John Slaney: 2000–01Aldege "Baz" Bastien Memorial Award (best goaltender)
 Matt Murray: 2014–15
 Brad Thiessen: 2010–11
 Dany Sabourin: 2005–06

Harry "Hap" Holmes Memorial Award (goalies with lowest goals against avg.)
 Tristan Jarry and Casey DeSmith: 2016–17
 Matt Murray and Jeff Zatkoff: 2014–15
 Jeff Deslauriers and Eric Hartzell: 2013–14
 Brad Thiessen and Jeff Zatkoff: 2012–13
 Brad Thiessen and John Curry: 2010–11
 Dany Sabourin: 2005–06Yanick Dupre Memorial Award (AHL Man of the Year Service)
 Matt Carkner: 2006–07

'''Louis A.R. Pieri Memorial Award (coach of the year)
 John Hynes: 2010–11

See also
Wilkes-Barre/Scranton Knights

References

External links
 Wilkes-Barre/Scranton Penguins Official Website
 The Internet Hockey Database – Wilkes-Barre/Scranton Penguins

 
Pittsburgh Penguins minor league affiliates
Professional ice hockey teams in Pennsylvania
Sports in the Scranton–Wilkes-Barre metropolitan area
Ice hockey clubs established in 1999
1999 establishments in Pennsylvania